Sam Duckworth (born 1986) is an English musician who performs as Get Cape. Wear Cape. Fly. He is also sometimes referred to as Get Cape, Cape, GCWCF and Slam Dunkworth (the latter title apparently first coined by Emmy the Great). According to Duckworth, his original stage name came from Retro Gamer magazine, from an article about superhero games such as Batman containing the heading "Get Cape. Wear Cape. Fly", although a Calvin & Hobbes cartoon by Bill Watterson has also been cited. In addition to the Get Cape name, and his given name, Duckworth has released music under the moniker Recreations.

Music career
Duckworth grew up in Southend-on-Sea, Essex. Get Cape was signed to Atlantic Records in March 2006, after playing many gigs, both with punk rock band Silverskin and as Get Cape. As Get Cape, Duckworth has collaborated with Billy Bragg, Nitin Sawhney, Shlomo, Killa Kela, Baba Maal, Flea, Kate Nash and many others with his participation in many events for Africa Express.

Duckworth co-organised The Demolition Ball – the last night at the London Astoria venue before it was knocked down in January 2009. He had previously headlined at the Astoria for his 21st birthday party.

After 10 years, Duckworth decided to end Get Cape. Wear Cape. Fly and to continue making under his own name. The "last ever" show under the Get Cape moniker was held at The Forum, Kentish Town on 12 September 2014.

In May 2017, Duckworth announced that he was resurrecting the Get Cape name, with the release of the single Optimist, and subsequently announced a new full-length album, Young Adult, due for release in January 2018.

The Chronicles of a Bohemian Teenager
Get Cape's debut album, The Chronicles of a Bohemian Teenager, is best described as an indie/folk/electronic fusion. The album made the top 100 albums of 2006 lists of Q and NME. It reached number 26 on the official UK album chart and spawned three top 40 singles.

In October 2006, he performed as part of the BBC Electric Proms. He played at a number of major festivals in 2007, including Oxegen, Glastonbury, Reading and Leeds Festivals and SXSW, and appeared in the BBC Radio 1 live lounge.

In January 2007, Duckworth was nominated for best solo artist at the annual NME Awards, up against Lily Allen, Jamie T, Jarvis Cocker and Thom Yorke, although he did not win.

The Album is gold certified in the UK.

Searching for the Hows and Whys
Get Cape's second album, Searching for the Hows and Whys was released on 3 March 2008. It features guest vocals from Kate Nash on the track, "Better Things". The album also features Billy Bragg on "Interlude". "Waiting for the Monster to Drown" was released as a free download via Get Cape's official website and MySpace on 7 December 2007. The first single released from the album was "Find The Time" which was released on 3 March 2008, and reached number 33 on the UK Singles Chart. The album was co produced with Nitin Sawhney

Get Cape. Wear Cape. Fly. [Self-titled]
The third and self-titled album was released on Cooking Vinyl on 13 September 2010, with the first single from the album "Collapsing Cities Feat. Shy FX" released on 9 August 2010. The album cover artwork was created by artist Jon Kipps and photographer Joe Lang.

The Mannequin

The Mannequin is the first album released under the name Sam Duckworth rather than 'Get Cape. Wear Cape. Fly.'

Maps
The fourth Get Cape. Wear Cape. Fly album was released on 7 May 2012.

London Royal
The fifth Get Cape. Wear Cape. Fly album was released on 15 September 2014 on Alcopop! Records. This accompanied a farewell UK tour between 28 August and 12 September.

Young Adult
The sixth Get Cape. Wear Cape. Fly album was due to be released in January 2018 through Xtra Mile Recordings. Singles from the release include "Adults/Always", "Just A Phase", "DNA" and "VHS Forever".

In March and April of 2019, Get Cape. Wear Cape. Fly opened for Pink Floyd's Nick Mason's Saucerful of Secrets on their 27 Date North American Tour.

Television
On 24 March 2008, he performed on Hollyoaks as part of a gig staged in the village. He also had an episode of American TV show One Tree Hill named after him. Every episode of the show has a title with a musical theme, either a song title or band name. Episode 3 of season 6 of One Tree Hill is titled "Get Cape. Wear Cape. Fly."

Personal life
Duckworth grew up in Southend-on-Sea and attended Southend High School for Boys between 1997 and 2004, studying up to A-level. He is well known for his debating and love for a variety of different musical styles. He has had run-ins with the British National Party after a racist attack in a nightclub which led to the song "Glasshouses", and he has since become an avid supporter of Love Music Hate Racism. He is a Fairtrade supporter.

Duckworth also took part in Oxfam's Blue campaign at Glastonbury which was shot by photographer Rankin.

In 2019 Duckworth co-produced a gala at Kings Place in London with Lily Allen called "Last Registration" in the run up to the General Election. These were released as a podcast series called "Arty Political Broadcast" and featured: Reni Eddo Lodge, Jordan Stephens, Guilaine Kinouani, George Lamb, Gizzi Erskine, Tansy Hoskins and a host of prominent activists and speakers.

Discography

Albums

EPs

Singles

Other contributors
Other members of the Get Cape. Wear Cape. Fly live band have included:
 Mikey Glenister – Cornet
 Andy Theakstone – Drums
 Gavin Fitzjohn – Trumpet, Sax
 Jamie Allen – Bass Guitar
 Tom Pinder – Trombone
 Tim Oliver – Keyboards
 Chris Bradshaw – Guitar
 Cody Webb – Bongo

References

1986 births
Living people
People from Southend-on-Sea
English male singer-songwriters
English rock guitarists
English male guitarists
21st-century English singers
Music in Southend-on-Sea
English people of Burmese descent
Atlantic Records artists
21st-century British guitarists
21st-century British male singers
Alcopop! Records artists